Koli or Kolli or Kali in Iran may refer to:

 Koli, Ardabil
 Kali, Bushehr
 Kali, East Azerbaijan
 Koli, East Azerbaijan
 Kali, Kermanshah
 Kolli, Sistan and Baluchestan
 Kali, South Khorasan
 Kali, Zanjan
 Koli-ye Olya (disambiguation)
 Koli-ye Sofla (disambiguation)
 Goli, Iran (disambiguation)